= Shenzhou Xueren =

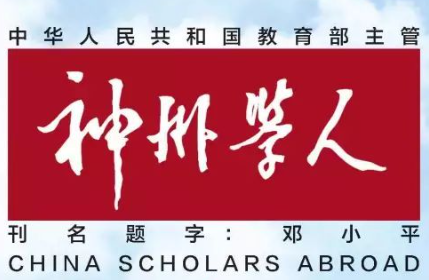
- Categories: Literary
- Frequency: Monthly
- Founded: 1987
- Country: China
- Based in: Beijing
- Language: Chinese
- Website: www.chisa.edu.cn
- ISSN: 1002-6738

Shenzhou Xueren (Chinese: 神州学人) or China Scholars Abroad, is a monthly Chinese-language magazine founded in May 1987, published by China Education Press Agency, and supervised by the Ministry of Education of the People’s Republic of China. The magazine's title was inscribed by Deng Xiaoping.

== Content ==
The magazine serves as a comprehensive publication primarily targeting overseas Chinese students, returned scholars, and professionals working in the field of study abroad. It features content covering China’s development, social issues, innovations in science and education, updates on study-abroad policies, student achievements, histories of overseas study, life experiences abroad, literary works by Chinese expatriate scholars, and international cultural perspectives.

Beginning as a bimonthly publication, it switched to a monthly format in 1993.

== Website ==
A web platform was launched in January 1995 as China’s first Chinese-language online news media, evolving into a multi-media website by 1998.
